Samantha Cazebonne (born 10 August 1971) is a French politician of La République En Marche! (LREM) who currently serves as a Senator.

She was formerly member of the National Assembly for the fifth constituency for French residents overseas, which includes Spain, Portugal, Monaco and Andorra.

Political career
Cazebonne served as the deputy from 19 June 2017 until 2 February 2018, when her election in June 2017 was annulled by the Constitutional Council, forcing a by-election, at which she was elected again.

In parliament, Cazebonne serves as member of the Committee on Foreign Affairs. In addition to her committee assignments, she chairs the French-Portuguese Parliamentary Friendship Group.

She was elected in the 2020 French Senate election.

Political positions
In July 2019, Cazebonne voted in favor of the French ratification of the European Union’s Comprehensive Economic and Trade Agreement (CETA) with Canada.

Other activities
 Agency for French Education Abroad (AEFE), Member of the Board of Directors

References

Living people
La République En Marche! politicians
Deputies of the 15th National Assembly of the French Fifth Republic
Women members of the National Assembly (France)
21st-century French women politicians
1971 births

Women members of the Senate (France)
French Senators of the Fifth Republic
Senators of French citizens living abroad